"Believe" is a song by American entertainer Cher from her twenty-second studio album of the same name (1998). It was released as the album's lead single on October 19, 1998, by Warner Bros. Records. After circulating for months, a demo written by Brian Higgins, Matthew Gray, Stuart McLennen and Timothy Powell, was submitted to Warner's chairman Rob Dickins, while he was scouting for songs to include on Cher's new album. Aside from the chorus, Dickins was not impressed by the track so he enlisted two more writers, Steve Torch and Paul Barry in order to complete it. Recording took place at Dreamhouse Studio in West London, while production was in charge of Mark Taylor and Brian Rawling. 

"Believe" is an upbeat dance-pop and electropop song and represents a complete musical departure from Cher's previous efforts. It featured a pioneering use of the audio processing software Auto-Tune to distort the singer's vocals, which was widely imitated and became known as the "Cher effect". The song's lyrics describe empowerment and self-sufficiency after a painful breakup. "Believe" has been met with appreciation ever since its release; music critics have praised in particular its production and catchiness, with some of whom deemed it as a highlight from the album, and listed it as one of Cher's most important releases. At the 42nd Annual Grammy Awards the song was nominated for the Record of the Year and the Best Dance Recording, winning the latter.

"Believe" was a commercial success worldwide, topping the record charts in over 23 countries and with sales of over 11 million copies is Cher's most successful single to date and one of the best-selling singles in music history. "Believe" was the biggest-selling song of 1998 in the United Kingdom and remains the highest-selling single by a solo female artist. In the United States it was Cher's fifth number-one single on the Billboard Hot 100 chart and topped the Year-End Hot 100 singles of 1999. The accompanying music video, directed by Nigel Dick, was nominated for Best Dance Video at the 1999 MTV Video Music Awards.

Cher has performed the song in several occasions, including the  1999 Brit Awards and the Sanremo Music Festival and it has been a regular staple in the set list of her concert tours ever since. "Believe" has been covered by numerous artists and it's also been sung or referenced in feature films and TV shows. Scholars and academics noted the way in which Cher was able to re-invent herself and remain fresh and contemporary amidst the more teen pop-based music of the period. They also credited the song for restoring Cher's popularity and cementing her position as a pop culture icon. "Believe" earned Cher a place in the Guinness Book of World Records; Rolling Stone listed it among the "500 Greatest Songs of All Time".

Writing
A demo of "Believe", written by Brian Higgins, Matthew Gray, Stuart McLennen and Timothy Powell, circulated at Warner Records for months. According to producer Mark Taylor, "everyone loved the chorus but not the rest of the song". Warner chairman Rob Dickins asked the production house Dreamhouse to work on it; their goal was to make a dance record that would not alienate Cher fans. Two more writers, Steve Torch and Paul Barry, joined and completed a version that Dickens and Cher were happy with."

Though she is not credited as a songwriter, Cher said she contributed the lines 'I need time to move on, I need love to be strong / I've had time to think it through and maybe I'm too good for you". According to Cher, "I was singing [the song] in the bathtub, and it seemed to me the second verse was too whiny. It kind of pissed me off, so I changed it. I toughened it up a bit."

Recording
"Believe" was recorded in mid-1998 in Kingston upon Thames, London, at the Dreamhouse studio operated by Metro Productions. It was assembled with Cubase VST on an early model Power Macintosh G3, with synthesizers including a Clavia Nord Rack and an Oberheim Matrix 1000. Cher's vocals were recorded on three TASCAM DA-88 digital audio recorders with a Neumann U67 microphone.

The effects on Cher's vocals were achieved using the pitch correction software Auto-Tune. Auto-Tune was designed to be used subtly to correct sharp or flat notes in vocal performances; however, Taylor used extreme settings to create unnaturally rapid corrections, thereby removing portamento, the natural slide between pitches in singing. Taylor said it was "the most nerve-wracking part of the project", as he was not sure how Cher would react. She approved and insisted the effect remain when Warner wanted it removed. In an attempt to protect their method, the producers initially claimed it was achieved using a vocoder. The effect was widely imitated and became known as the "Cher effect".

Composition
"Believe" is a dance-pop and electropop song. It contains uncredited samples of "Prologue" & "Epilogue" performed by the Electric Light Orchestra. The track was recorded in the key of F major with a tempo of 133 beats per minute. The song follows a chord progression of F–C–Gm–B–F–Am7–Gm–Dm, and Cher's vocal range spans from the low note of F3 to the high note of C5.

Critical reception
Upon the release, Chuck Taylor from Billboard said that it is "the best darn thing that Cher has recorded in years". He added, "Some songs are so natural, so comfortably sung, that you wonder that somebody didn't think them up decades before. With this, you'll be whirling around the floor, tapping hard on the accelerator to "Believe," a simple ode to those feelings that we all search out and cling to. Cher is just a prize here; even her hardy detractors will be fighting the beat on this one." Music critic Robert Christgau highlighted "Believe" as the best song on the album. A reviewer from Entertainment Weekly described the song as "poptronica glaze, the soon-to-be club fave..." and noted Cher's voice as "unmistakable". Deborah Wilker from Knight Ridder said that "her electronically altered vocal" on "Believe" "is like nothing she's ever done." 

Knight Ridder also described the song as "present-tense disco, with Cher an anthemic, Madonna manqué." New York Daily News described the song as a "club track so caffeinated, it not only microwaved her cold career to scorching-hot but gave dance music its biggest hit since the days of disco." They also noted the song's "killer hook and amazing beat." Neil Strauss from The New York Times wrote that "the verses are rich and bittersweet, with the added gimmick of breaking up Cher's voice through an effect that makes her sound robotic. And the choruses are catchy and uplifting, with Cher wailing, "Do you believe in life after love?" All of it bounces over a bed of 80s-style electronic pop. It is a song with a universal theme—a woman trying to convince herself that she can survive a breakup". Another editor, Jim Sullivan, noted the track as a "hooky, defiant, beat-fest of a song".

Retrospective response
In 2019, Bill Lamb from About.com declared it as a "perfect piece of dance-pop", including it in his list of "Top 10 Pop Songs of 1999". AllMusic editor Joe Viglione called "Believe" a "pop masterpiece, one of the few songs to be able to break through the impenetrable wall of late 1990s fragmented radio to permeate the consciousness of the world at large." Another editor, Michael Gallucci, gave a lukewarm review, writing that the Believe album is an "endless, and personality-free, thump session". Stopera and Galindo from BuzzFeed noted it as "iconic", featuring it in their "The 101 Greatest Dance Songs of the '90s" in 2017. Damon Albarn, frontman of the bands Blur and Gorillaz, called the song "brilliant". 

In 2014, Tom Ewing from Freaky Trigger wrote that "Believe" "is a record in the "I Will Survive" mode of embattled romantic defiance – a song to make people who've lost out in love feel like they're the winners." He added that "it's remarkable that it took someone until 1998 to come up with "do you believe in life after love?", and perhaps even more remarkable that it wasn't Jim Steinman, but the genius of the song is how aggressive and righteous Cher makes it sound." Bob Waliszewski of Plugged In said that Cher "musters self-confidence to deal with a failed romance". In 2018, Dave Fawbert from ShortList described "Believe" as a "really great pop song with, as ever, an absolute powerhouse vocal performance from Cher".

Chart performance

The song was released as the album's lead single on October 19, 1998, peaked at number one in 21 countries worldwide. On January 23, 1999, it reached the Top 40 on the Billboard Hot 100 and reached number one on the chart on March 13, making Cher the oldest female artist (at the age of 52) to perform this feat. Cher also set the record for the longest gap between number-one singles on the Hot 100; there was a gap of 33 years and 7 months between her singles "I Got You Babe" and "Believe" reaching number one. "Believe" was ranked as the number-one song of 1999 by "Billboard" on both the "Billboard" Hot 100 and Hot Dance Club Play charts and became the biggest single in her entire career. "Believe" became Cher's 17th and last top ten hit in the US.

In the United Kingdom, "Believe" debuted atop the UK Singles Chart on October 25, 1998 – for the week ending date October 31, 1998 – during a week in which the top five singles were all new entries, a first for the chart. It became Cher's fourth number one in the UK and remained at the top of the chart for seven consecutive weeks. "Believe" become Britain's biggest-selling song of 1998, and won its writers three Ivor Novello Awards (for Best Selling UK Single, for Best Song Musically and Lyrically, and for International Hit of the Year) at the 1999 ceremony. On July 30, 2021, "Believe" was certified Quadruple Platinum by the British Phonographic Industry. As of October 2017, the song has sold 1,830,000 copies in Britain, making it the biggest-selling song by a woman on the UK Singles Chart. At 52 years old Cher was the oldest female artist to top the UK charts, a record that has since been broken by Kate Bush who was 63 when "Running Up That Hill" reached number one.

The success of the song not only expanded through each country's singles chart, but also most countries' dance charts. In the United States "Believe" spent 15 weeks on the U.S. Hot Dance Club Play chart, five of those weeks at number one, and 22 weeks on the European Hot Dance Charts. "Believe" also set a record in 1999 after spending 21 weeks in the top spot of the Billboard Hot Dance Singles Sales chart, it was still in the top ten even one year after its entry on the chart. On October 13, 2008, the song was voted number 10 on Australian VH1's Top 10 Number One Pop Songs countdown. "Believe" was nominated for Record of the Year and Best Dance Recording at 42nd Grammy Awards, the latter of which it won. Peter Rauhofer (Club 69) won the Grammy Award in 2000 for Best Remixer of the Year for his remix of Cher's "Believe".

Music video
The official music video for "Believe", directed by Nigel Dick, features Cher in a nightclub in a double role as a singer on stage while wearing a glowing headdress and as a supernatural being in a cage (with auto-tuned voice) surrounded by many people to whom she is giving advice. The video largely revolves around a woman who is in the club looking for her boyfriend and is heartbroken when she sees him with another woman. The version on The Very Best of Cher: The Video Hits Collection is slightly different from the previous version (the version that is also included on the Mallay Believe Bonus VCD) with additional scenes towards the end that were not in the original video. There are also two 'rough' versions of the video as the song was released in Europe before a video was completed. The first is a compilation of scenes from the videos of Cher's previous singles "One by One" and "Walking in Memphis" and the second includes a brief scene of the "Believe" video where Cher sings the chorus while the rest of the video is composed of scenes from "One by One".

Three official remix videos exist for this song. Two of the remix videos were created by Dan-O-Rama in 1999. Both follow different concepts from the original unmixed video. Instead of showing the significance of the lyrics the videos mostly show Cher with different colored backgrounds and people dancing. The two remixes used for these videos were the Almighty Definitive Mix and the Club 69 Phunk Club Mix. The third video entitled Wayne G. Remix was released by Warner Bros. and the concept is similar to the Club 69 Phunk Club Mix video.

Billboard music critic Chuck Taylor in March 1999 graded the video a "C", praising Cher's appearance and hairstyle but criticizing "an unnecessary subplot about a few kids stalking each other."

Live performances
Cher performed the song during the Do You Believe?, The Farewell Tour, Cher at the Colosseum and the Dressed to Kill Tour. While she would lip-sync the entire song on various television programs, she would only lip-sync the synthesized verses when performing on her Believe and Farewell tours, the Colosseum shows and on the 2002 edition of VH1 Divas Live. Since 1999, the song has been the encore to all of Cher's concerts until her 2014 Dressed to Kill Tour, where the encore is the ballad "I Hope You Find It", a second single from her 25th studio album Closer to the Truth. It returned as the encore at her Classic Cher (2017-2020) shows and stayed in that place for the Here We Go Again Tour (2018-2020) as well.

Legacy

VH1 placed "Believe" at number 60 in their list of 100 Greatest Dance Songs in 2000 and at number 74 in their list of 100 Greatest Songs of the 90s in 2007. In 2007, Rolling Stone placed "Believe" at No. 10 in their list of the "20 Most Annoying Songs" In 2020, British national newspaper The Guardian ranked "Believe" as the 83rd greatest UK number one. "Believe" was placed on the 2021 revised list of Rolling Stones "500 Greatest Songs of All Time".

In July 2020, a digital publication The Pudding carried out a study on the most iconic songs from the '90s and songs that are most known by Millennials and the people of Generation Z. "Believe" was the sixth song with the highest recognisability rate.

Accolades

(*) indicates the list is unordered.

Other versions
In May 2012 after successfully auditioning for The X Factor UK, Ella Henderson, then 16 years old, performed a ballad arrangement of "Believe" after the Bootcamp round, reducing guest judge Nicole Scherzinger to tears. The cover, which was based on Adam Lambert's version performed on American Idol in 2009, was so popular for its slow tempo, emotional interpretation that Henderson released an acoustic performance in 2013 on YouTube and performed it at the National Television Awards on January 23, 2013. Henderson also included a studio version of the cover on a deluxe edition of her debut album "Chapter One" as part of a pre-order EP "Chapter One Sessions".    

In December 2018 Lambert performed his ballad version of "Believe" again in honor of Cher during the 41st annual Kennedy Center Honors; the performance was highly acclaimed, with Cher stating that she was "at a loss for words" and was moved to tears. On December 6, 2019, Lambert released a studio version of his version of "Believe" which reached number 23 on the Billboard Digital Song Sales chart on December 21, 2019.

Track listings

 US maxi-CD single "Believe" (album version) – 3:59
 "Believe" (Phat 'N' Phunky club mix) – 7:42
 "Believe" (Club 69 Phunk club mix) – 8:55
 "Believe" (Almighty Definitive Mix) – 7:36
 "Believe" (Xenomania Mad Tim and the Mekon club mix) – 9:15
 "Believe" (Club 69 Future Anthem Mix) – 9:20
 "Believe" (Grip's Heartbroken Mix) – 9:12
 "Believe" (Club 69 Future Anthem Dub) – 7:13
 "Believe" (Club 69 Phunk Dub) – 7:04
 "Believe" (Phat 'N' Phunky "After Luv" Dub) – 6:22

 US 7-inch and cassette single, UK cassette single "Believe" (album version) – 3:59
 "Believe" (Xenomania Mix) – 4:20

 UK and European CD1 "Believe" – 3:58
 "Believe" (Almighty Definitive Mix) – 7:35
 "Believe" (Xenomania Mix) – 4:20

 UK and European CD2 "Believe" – 3:58
 "Believe" (Grip's Heartbroken Mix) – 9:12
 "Believe" (Club 69 Future Mix) – 6:50

 European two-track CD single "Believe" – 3:58
 "Believe" (Grip's Heartbroken Mix) – 9:12

 Australian maxi-CD single'''
 "Believe" (Phat 'N' Phunky club mix) – 7:44
 "Believe" (Xenomania Mad Tim and the Mekon club mix) – 9:16
 "Believe" (Club 69 Phunk club mix) – 6:50
 "Believe" (Club 69 Future Anthem Mix) – 9:24
 "Believe" (album version) – 3:58

Credits and personnel
Credits are adapted from the Believe'' album liner notes.

 Cher – vocals
 Mark Taylor – producer, arranger, programming, keyboards
 Brian Rawling – production
 Brian Higgins – composition
 Stuart McLennen – composition
 Paul Barry – composition
 Steven Torch – composition
 Matthew Gray – composition
 Timothy Powell – composition
 Gypsyland – background vocals, guitar
 Robin Smith – arranger
 Adam Phillips – additional guitars
 Ryan Art – designer
 Michael Lavine – cover art photographer
 Rob Dickins – executive production

Charts

Weekly charts

Year-end charts

Decade-end charts

All-time charts

Certifications and sales

Release history

See also

 List of number-one singles in Australia during the 1990s
 List of Ultratop 50 number-one hits of 1998 (Belgium)
 List of Ultratop 40 number-one hits of 1999 (Belgium)
 List of number-one singles of 1999 (Canada)
 List of number-one hits of 1998 (Denmark)
 List of number-one hits of 1999 (Denmark)
 List of European number-one hits of 1998
 List of European number-one hits of 1999
 List of number-one singles of 1999 (France)
 List of number-one hits of 1998 (Germany)
 List of number-one hits of 1998 (Italy)
 List of number-one hits of 1999 (Italy)
 List of number-one singles of 1999 (Netherlands)
 List of number-one singles of 1998 (Norway)
 List of number-one singles of 1998 (Spain)
 List of number-one singles of 1999 (Spain)
 List of number-one singles of 2005 (Sweden)
 List of number-one singles of the 1990s (Switzerland)
 List of UK Singles Chart number ones of the 1990s
 List of Billboard Hot 100 number-one singles of 1999
 List of number-one dance singles of 1998 (U.S.)
 List of number-one dance singles of 1999 (U.S.)

References

External links
 About Cher on the official Cher site (mentions "Believe")

1998 singles
1998 songs
Billboard Hot 100 number-one singles
Cher songs
Dutch Top 40 number-one singles
European Hot 100 Singles number-one singles
Grammy Award for Best Dance Recording
Grammy Award for Best Remixed Recording, Non-Classical
Irish Singles Chart number-one singles
Music videos directed by Nigel Dick
Number-one singles in Australia
Number-one singles in Denmark
Number-one singles in Germany
Number-one singles in Greece
Number-one singles in Hungary
Number-one singles in Italy
Number-one singles in New Zealand
Number-one singles in Norway
Number-one singles in Scotland
Number-one singles in Spain
Number-one singles in Sweden
Number-one singles in Switzerland
RPM Top Singles number-one singles
SNEP Top Singles number-one singles
Song recordings produced by Brian Rawling
Song recordings produced by Mark Taylor (record producer)
Songs written by Brian Higgins (producer)
Songs written by Paul Barry (songwriter)
Songs written by Steve Torch
Songs written by Tim Powell (producer)
UK Singles Chart number-one singles
Ultratop 50 Singles (Flanders) number-one singles
Ultratop 50 Singles (Wallonia) number-one singles
Warner Records singles